The following people played for the Los Angeles Wildcats for at least one game in the 1926 AFL regular season, the only one of the team's (and the league's) existence:

1 Position now known as quarterback
2 Played wingback, tailback, and blocking back
3 Played fullback and blocking back
4 Also played end
5 Also played tackle

References
Los Angeles Wildcats 1926 roster

 
Los Angeles Wildcats players